A multigraph (or pleongraph) is a sequence of letters that behaves as a unit and is not the sum of its parts, such as English  or French . The term is infrequently used, as the number of letters is usually specified:

 Tetragraph (four letters, as German )
 Pentagraph (five letters)
 Hexagraph (six letters)
 Heptagraph (seven letters)

Combinations longer than tetragraphs are unusual. Except for doubled trigraphs like German , hexagraphs are found only in Irish vowels, where the outside letters indicate whether the neighboring consonant is "broad" or "slender". However, these sequences are not predictable.

Beyond the Latin alphabet, Morse code uses hexagraphs for several punctuation marks, and the dollar sign  is a heptagraph, . Longer sequences are considered ligatures, and are transcribed as such in the Latin alphabet.

See also
 Unigraph (orthography)